The 6th Canadian Film Awards were presented on May 10, 1954 to honour achievements in Canadian film. The ceremony was hosted by J. R. White, the president of Imperial Oil.

Winners

Film of the Year: The Seasons — National Film Board of Canada, Christopher Chapman producer and director
Theatrical Feature Length (Documentary): Not awarded
Theatrical Short: Farewell Oak Street — National Film Board of Canada, Gordon Burwash producer, Grant McLean director
Honourable Mention: Danish Seining — Atlantic Films and Electronics, Herman Noelle director
Honourable Mention: L'Abatis (The Settler) — National Film Board of Canada, Guy Glover producer, Bernard Devlin and Raymond Garceau directors 
Non-Theatrical, Open: The Seasons — National Film Board of Canada, Christopher Chapman producer and director
Honourable Mention: Embryonic Development: The Chick — National Film Board of Canada, J.V. Durden producer and director
Non-Theatrical, Government Sponsored: World at Your Feet — National Film Board of Canada, Michael Spencer producer, Larry Gosnell director
Honourable Mention: Everybody's Handicapped — Graphic Associates, John Ross producer, Ernest Reid director
Non-Theatrical, Non-Government Sponsored: Episode in Valleydale — Crawley Films, George Gorman producer and director
Honourable Mention: Polysar — Crawley Films, Peter Cock producer and director
Honourable Mention: The Ring-Necked Pheasant — T. M. Short director

Special Mentions:
Les Routes de Québec — Service de Ciné-Photographie, Government of Quebec
Food for Freddy — Crawley Films, Peter Cock producer and director
1953 Grey Cup Final — Davart Productions
Kumak the Sleepy Hunter — Dunclaren Productions
Canadian Pattern — Associated Screen Studios
Prelude to Kitimat — Lew Parry
Brazil — Crawley Films, Peter Cock producer and director
Herring Hunt — National Film Board of Canada, Guy Glover producer, Julian Biggs director
Treasures of the Ukraine — E. F. Attridge
A-Hunting We Will Go — Edmonton Movie and Photo Club
Amateur: Eight-Fifteen — Toronto Film Society

Special Award
Gordon Sparling, Associated Screen Studios — "for distinguished service to the art of the film in Canada and to the Canadian film industry".

References

Canadian
06
1954 in Canada